Waterville Airport may refer to:
 Waterville Airport (Washington) in Waterville, WA, USA
 Waterville/Kings County Municipal Airport in Waterville, NS, CAN
 Waterville Robert LaFleur Airport in Waterville, ME, USA